Anjali Nair may refer to:

Anjali Nair (actress, born 1988), Indian actress primarily in Malayalam films
Anjali Nair (actress, born 1995), Indian actress in Tamil films